Norman Uphoff (born 1940) is an American social scientist now involved with agroecology serving as a Professor of Government and International Agriculture at Cornell University. He is the acting director of the Cornell Institute for Public Affairs and former director of the Cornell International Institute for Food, Agriculture, and Development (CIIFAD) 1990–2005.

Early life and career

Uphoff was raised on a Wisconsin dairy farm. In 1966, he took his master's degree from Princeton University in public affairs.  He then earned a doctorate in political science, public administration, and development economics from the University of California at Berkeley in 1970, at which time he began teaching at Cornell University. There he chaired the Rural Development Committee until 1990 and worked on various aspects of participatory development: local organization, farmer associations, irrigation management, and other approaches to assisting small farmers in the developing world. In the 1980s, he served on USAID's Research Advisory Committee and the South Asia Committee of the U.S. Social Science Research Council, and for over four decades has been a consultant for the World Bank, USAID, the United Nations, FAO, the Ford Foundation, the Consultative Group on International Agricultural Research, and other agencies. After being appointed as the first director of CIIFAD in 1990, his work became focused more on strategies for sustainable agriculture and rural development. Professor Uphoff teaches the CIPA core foundation course, GOVT 6927: Planning and Management of Agricultural and Rural Development.

Expertise

Uphoff is a subject-matter expert in development administration, irrigation management, local participation, and strategies for broad-based rural development. His interests have expanded beyond the social sciences to include new knowledge and practice in soil science and microbiology. In 1993, he became acquainted in Madagascar with the System of Rice Intensification (SRI) through the NGO Association Tefy Saina. Farmers who used SRI methods, having gotten paddy yields averaging only 2 tons/hectare paddy with their usual methods, on soil that was evaluated as 'very poor,' without using new varieties and without depending on chemical fertilizer, and with less water, were able to average 8 tons/hectare. After such results were attained for three consecutive years and were seen in other parts of Madagascar as well, Uphoff began trying to get agricultural specialists in other countries to use and evaluate the alternative SRI methods for themselves. In 1999–2000, SRI results were validated by rice scientists in China and Indonesia, and since then, the testing and dissemination of SRI have spread to almost 50 countries, showing how more rice can be produced with less water, less cost, and often less labor. But this agroecological methodology has not been without its critics and opponents.

SRI
Uphoff leads the Cornell University initiative to alleviate the global food crisis with new methods of growing rice, System of Rice Intensification. Rice harvests typically increase by 50 to 100%, or more when rice seedlings are planted at a young age, with wide spacing (reducing plant population per m2 by 80-90% and with no continuous flooding of the field. That cuts water and seed costs while promoting root and leaf growth. The resulting plants are more resistant to climate-change effects of drought, storm damage and extreme temperatures. The System of Rice Intensification emphasizes the individual plant quality over quantity, and this supports a "less-is-more” approach to rice cultivation. SRI has experienced significant professional headwind, including criticism by a few of Uphoff's peers at Cornell University. There is now, however, extensive scientific literature on SRI, most of it validating and elaborating on the early reports about SRI effectiveness. Some scientists at the International Rice Research Institute have also been critics, but IRRI now has an SRI page on its website. IRRI started the Green Revolution raising grain production through rice genetics. Governments in China, India, Indonesia, Vietnam and Cambodia, where two-thirds of the world's rice is produced, are now promoting SRI methods to raise paddy yields.

CIIFAD's work on SRI was made possible by the support, provided anonymously, by Charles F. Feeney's Atlantic Philanthropies in 1990. Cornell was given $15 million to work toward sustainable agricultural and rural development with colleagues in developing countries  It was in connection with his duties as CIIFAD director that Dr. Uphoff learned about SRI in Madagascar in 1993 and was able to travel to many other countries to encourage other to learn about and evaluate SRI's agroecological methods, which have now been extended or extrapolated to other crops: wheat, finger millet, sugarcane, teff, green, red and black grams, and several vegetables. Since 1997, Uphoff has given presentations on SRI in 41 countries. 
Uphoff's approach has been to work from the ground up, seeking the input and participation of farmers in developing countries, while also communicating with the scientific community and with policymakers, civil society and the private sector. As he states, “In part, because most agricultural scientists have been so skeptical, even dismissive of SRI, our work has usually begun with NGO's and the farmers they assist. There have been a few agricultural researchers who have had open minds and have taken an interest in SRI from the outset, but mostly we have developed our understanding of SRI and have made adaptations in close association with farmers. Now the scientific community is becoming more interested.”

Sample publications
 
 ;
 ;
 X.Q. Lin, D.F. Zhu, H.Z. Chen, S.H. Cheng and N. Uphoff, "Effect of plant density and nitrogen fertilizer rates on grain yield and nitrogen uptake of hybrid rice (Oryza sativa L.)," Journal of Agrobiotechnology and Sustainable Development, 1, 44-53 (2009);
 N. Uphoff et al., Biological Approaches to Sustainable Soil Systems (2006)(chief editor);
 N. Uphoff,  "System of Rice Intensification responds to 21st Century Needs," Rice Today, IRRI, 3, 42-43 (2004);
 N. Uphoff, ed., Agroecological Innovations: Increasing Food Production with Participatory Development (2002);
 N. Uphoff, M.J. Esman and A. Krishna, Reasons for Success: Learning from Instructive Experiences in Rural Development (1997);
 N. Uphoff, ed., Puzzles of Productivity in Public Organizations (1994);
 N. Uphoff, Learning from Gal Oya: Possibilities for Participatory Development and Post-Newtonian Social Science (1992);
 Norman Uphoff, Local Institutional Development (1986);
 Norman Uphoff & Warren Ilchman, The Political Economy of Development: Theoretical and Empirical Contributions (1972), ;
 Norman Uphoff & Warren Ilchman, The Political Economy of Change (1969).

References

External links
 Official Curricula Vitae.

1941 births
Living people
Princeton University alumni
Cornell University faculty
Educators from Wisconsin